Harpyia milhauseri, the tawny prominent, is a moth of the family Notodontidae. The species was first described by Johan Christian Fabricius in 1775. It is mainly found in central Europe.

The wingspan is 40–52 mm. The moth flies from May to June depending on the location.

The larvae feed on Quercus, Fagus and occasionally Betula.

External links

Fauna Europaea
Lepiforum e.V.

Notodontidae
Moths of Europe
Moths of Asia
Moths described in 1775
Taxa named by Johan Christian Fabricius